This is a list of cities in the Levant with a population of 500,000 or more. For the purposes of this list, the region includes the Syria, Palestine, Lebanon, Cyprus, Israel, Jordan and the Hatay Province of Turkey. All figures refer to the metropolitan area if applicable.

See also 
List of largest metropolitan areas of the Middle East
List of cities of the ancient Near East
List of largest cities in the Arab world

Notes 
1.East Jerusalem claimed by Palestine.
Lists of cities by population
Populated places in Western Asia